IRL may refer to:

Places
 Republic of Ireland (ISO 3166-1 alpha-3 country code)
 Irlam railway station (National Rail station code IRL), England

Organizations
 International Rugby League, the governing body for the sport of rugby league
 Industrial Research Limited, New Zealand 
 Isamaa ja Res Publica Liit (Pro Patria and Res Publica Union), an Estonian political party
 Institute for Research on Learning, Palo Alto, California, US, 1986–2000
 Institut Ramon Llull, promoting Catalan language and culture
 Ipswich Rugby League, Australian rugby league football competition

Other uses 
 IRL (film), a 2013 film
 Indy Racing League 1995–2013, later INDYCAR
 Internet resource locator
 "In real life", internet term
 In Real Life (band), boy band
 Inverse reinforcement learning, in machine learning

See also 
 In Real Life (disambiguation)